Night and Sleep is an 1878 painting by Evelyn De Morgan, an English painter whose works were influenced by the style of the Pre-Raphaelite movement. In the painting dark-haired Night guides her son Sleep. His relaxed pose is set against the "more energetic line of his mother's body." Art historian Elise Lawton Smith notes that the couple's "horizontality suggests both sleep and lateral movement as they pass across the landscape". Poppies, symbolic of sleep, peace, death and the artist's pacifism, are listlessly strewn by the somnolent Sleep as he passes.

References

1878 paintings
Paintings by Evelyn De Morgan